Clash is a 2016 internationally co-produced drama film directed by Mohamed Diab. It was officially selected by the 2016 Cannes Film Festival and was the opening film of the Festival's Un Certain Regard section that year. It was selected as the Egyptian entry for the Best Foreign Language Film at the 89th Academy Awards but it was not nominated. It won the award for Best Film at the 2016 International Film Festival of Kerala.

Set just after the political events of June 2013, the film is shot entirely in the confines of a police van containing Muslim Brotherhood members and pro-army supporters, as well as other people belonging to neither of these factions.

Cast
 Nelly Karim
 Hany Adel
 Mohammed Alaa
 Khaled Kamal
 Ali Altayeb
 Mai Elghety
 Hosni Sheta
 Ahmed Malik
 Mohamed Gamal Kalbaz
 Ashraf Hamdi

Reception
The film has a rating of 93%  on Rotten Tomatoes based on 40 reviews.

Deborah Young of The Hollywood Reporter states the film "will be remembered as one of the most telling depictions of modern Egypt yet filmed" and "is an original, often quite disturbing experience to watch".

Jay Weissberg of Variety writes "this is bravura filmmaking with a kick-in-the-gut message about chaos and cruelty (with some humanity)."

Tom Hanks praised the film by saying: "If there's any way you can see CLASH by Egyptian director Mohamed Diab, you must. You simply must. The film will break your heart, but enlighten all."

See also
 List of submissions to the 89th Academy Awards for Best Foreign Language Film
 List of Egyptian submissions for the Academy Award for Best Foreign Language Film

References

External links
 

2016 films
2016 drama films
Egyptian drama films
2010s Arabic-language films
Films set in 2013
Films set in Egypt
Films shot in Egypt